The Kuwait national under-23 football team is the youth association football team representing Kuwait in youth competitions and it is controlled by Kuwait Football Association. Kuwait under 23 Could also be called as Kuwait Olympic Team. Kuwait under 23 also represents its country in the Olympic Games. From 1900 to 1976 Kuwait did not qualify for the Olympic Games but in 1980 Kuwait qualified for the Olympic Games in China and had the best record of their country finishing in the quarter-finals of that Olympic games. Kuwait missed the 1984 and 1988 Olympic games. But in 1992 Kuwait finally qualified for the 1992 Olympic Games in Spain, however with their poor performance, Kuwait was eliminated in the first round of that tournament. After that Kuwait had missed the 1996 Olympic Games that was hosted by the United States, Kuwait then successfully qualified for the 2000 Olympic Games in Australia and that was the last time Kuwait qualified for the Olympic Games. Kuwait has never won the GCC U-23 Championship but their best finish at that Competition was as a runner up in 2010. In the 2022 Asian U-23 qualification Cup Group D, Kuwait managed to defeat Bangladesh by 1-0 and Saudi Arabia by 2-1, this resulted in Kuwait to successfully qualify for the 2022 Asian U-23 Cup.

Honours

Regional honours
GCC U-23 Championship
Runners-up (2): 2010, 2015

Minor
2018 Olympic Return Cup

History
Kuwait’s first-ever qualification to the Olympic games was in the 1980 Olympic Games which Kuwait were eliminated in the quarter-finals of that Olympic games. Kuwait missed the 1984 Olympic Games and the 1988 Olympic Games. Kuwait came back to the Olympic Games in 1992 after missing two events being eliminated in the quarter-final of that event. Kuwait did not qualify until the 2000 Olympic Games and that was the last time Kuwait qualified for the Olympic games. Kuwait did not qualify to the Olympic Games in 2004 after being eliminated in the qualifying Preliminary round 3 of the Football at the 2004 Summer Olympics – Qualifiers at the third position of the 3rd group. Kuwait was unqualified from Football at the 2008 Summer Olympics – Qualifier, with 2 being 4 goals less than Qatar due to that, Kuwait missed the 2008 Olympic Games. Kuwait also failed to participate in the 2012 Olympic Games after losing Football at the 2012 Summer Olympics – Qualifiers, within losing the first leg to Japan 3-1 but then Kuwait defeated Japan 2-1, Japan won on the aggregate.
Kuwait does not have a good record at GCC U-23 Championship after finishing 5th in the final group of the 2008 GCC U-23 Championship.
Kuwait was at the bottom of the table at that time. In 2010 Kuwait was the runner-up of their group. Kuwait was qualified for the semi-finals, Kuwait defeated Oman 5-4 on penalties. But lost to UAE. In the 2011 and 2012 GCC U-23 Championship, Kuwait was unfortunately eliminated in the first round with 0 points losing all three games.

Participation in Tournaments

Summer Olympics

Asian Games
From 2002 Asian Games, at the first tournament to be played in an under-23 format.

AFC U-23 Asian Cup

Kuwait's fixtures and results

2021

2022

Current squad
The following players were called-up for the 2022 AFC U-23 Asian Cup, held between 1−19 June 2022.

Coaching staff

See also
 Kuwait national football team 
 Kuwait national under-20 football team
 Kuwait national under-17 football team
 Kuwait women's national football team

References

u23
Asian national under-23 association football teams